The Desperados Are in Town is a 1956 American Western film directed by Kurt Neumann and starring Robert Arthur and Kathleen Nolan.

It was a B movie made for the bottom half of double bills.

It was known as The Outlaws are in Town. Kurt Neumann signed to make the movie in July 1956.

Plot
A farm hand from Georgia goes west to Texas, but finds the area overrun with outlaws.

Cast
 Robert Arthur as Lenny Kesh  
 Kathleen Nolan as Alice Rutherford (as Kathy Nolan)
 Rhys Williams as Jud Collins  
 Rhodes Reason as Frank Banner  
 Dave O'Brien as Dock Lapman / Mr. Brown  
 Kelly Thordsen as Big Tobe Lapman  
 Mae Clarke as Jane Kesh  
 Robert Osterloh as Deputy Sheriff Mike Broome  
 William Challee as Tom Kesh  
 Carol Kelly as Hattie 
 Frank Sully as Carl Branch  
 Morris Ankrum as Mr. Rutherford  
 Dick Wessel as Hank Green (as Richard Wessel)
 Dorothy Granger as Molly, Saloon Girl (as Dorothy Grainger)
 Tod Griffin as Ranger 
 Nancy Evans as Mrs. Rutherford  
 Ann Stebbins as Girl 
 Byron Foulger as Jim Day

See also
List of American films of 1956

References

Bibliography
 Quinlan, David. The Film Lover's Companion: An A to Z Guide to 2,000 Stars and the Movies They Made. Carol Publishing Group, 1997.

External links
 
 
 

1956 films
1956 Western (genre) films
American Western (genre) films
CinemaScope films
Films directed by Kurt Neumann
Films scored by Paul Sawtell
1950s English-language films
1950s American films
American black-and-white films